Moltrasio is a  (municipality) in the Province of Como in the Italian region Lombardy, located about  north of Milan and about  north of Como, near the border with Switzerland, on the western shore of Lake Como.

Moltrasio borders the following municipalities: Blevio, Bruzella (Switzerland), Caneggio (Switzerland), Carate Urio, Cernobbio, Schignano, Torno.

References

External links

 Official website

Cities and towns in Lombardy